The 2012 International Women's Club Championship was the first world wide international women's football club tournament, and was held in Japan from November 22–25, 2012. Four teams, comprising representatives from Europe, Australia and Japan, took part in the competition.

Organization
It was held as the first competition of women's club championship in 2012, and was hosted by Japan Football Association and Japan Women's Football league. Fuji Television and  affiliated, and Sankei Shimbun, Sankei Sports, city of Saitama and Saitama Sports Commission supported the competition.

Participating teams

Venues
Two venues for the competition and both are in Saitama.

Results

Tournament map

Semifinals

3rd Place Playoff

Final

Awards

Goal Scorers
2 goals

 Azusa Iwashimizu
 Asano Nagasato
 Lara Dickenmann 
 Beverly Goebel-Yanez 

1 goal

 Jennifer Bisset
 Michelle Heyman
 Hayley Raso
 Sonia Bompastor
 Corine Franco
 Louisa Nécib
 
 Nanase Kiryu
 Shinobu Ohno
 Megumi Takase
 Ji So-Yun
 Lotta Schelin

Own Goals
1 goal

 Saori Ariyoshi

Referees
 Pannipar Kamnueng
 Sook-Hee Kim

Assistants:

 Rikako Arakawa
 Kumi Sunaga 
 Hisae Yoshizawa 
 Makoto Bozono
 Chie Ohata 
 Mayumi Yonemura 
 Shiho Ayukai 
 Naomi Makino 

Fourth:
 Etsuko Fukano 
 Sachiko Yamagishi

Prize-pool
The total prize-pool was 100,000$.
1st 60,000$
2nd 30,000$
3rd 10,000$

References

External links
International women's club football (Japanese)

2012 in women's association football
2012
2012 in Japanese women's football
2012–13 in French women's football
2012–13 in Australian women's soccer
2012